Rhytiphora bankii is a species of beetle in the family Cerambycidae. It was first described by Johan Christian Fabricius in 1775, under the genus Lamia. It is known from Australia, the Philippines, Borneo, Java, Micronesia, New Guinea, Hawaii, Moluccas, Sumatra, Vietnam, and has been introduced into Japan. The Australian species of Prosoplus were synonymised with Rhytiphora in 2013.

It feeds on Agave sisalana, and plants from the Apocynaceae, Asparagaceae, Asteraceae, Capparaceae, Chenopodaceae, Euphorbiaceae, Fabaceae, Malvaceae, Poaceae, and Rutaceae families.

Some synonymies 
Lamia bankii Fabricius, 1775 was transferred to the genus, Prosoplus, in 1961 by Stephan von Breuning, and then to the genus, Rhytiphora, by Adam Slipinski and Hermes Escalona in 2013, a change not universally accepted. (See e.g. Titan)

Coptops abdominalis White, 1858 was transferred to the genus, Prosoplus, in 1961 by Stephan von Breuning, and thence to Rhytiphora in 2013.  However, in 1922 Christopher Aurivillius synonymised Coptops abdominalis with Prosoplus bankii. This synonymisation  was repeated by Keith McKeown in 1947.

References

bankii
Beetles described in 1775
Taxa named by Johan Christian Fabricius